Mitchell "Mitch" Lewis (born September 30, 1954 in Toronto, Ontario, Canada) is a Canadian multi-instrumentalist who has been continuously active in the music industry in a variety of genres since 1974.

Career
Lewis' career began in 1974 when a fellow musician paid for his union entrance to have him play on his record. Since then, he has performed or recorded with hundreds of musicians from all over the world and travels extensively for both. As a youth he played with jazz flautist Jane Bunnett, and more recently, has performed with jazz pianist Robi Botos. A shortlist of musicians he has performed or recorded with includes: John Hammond Jr., Eddie "Cleanhead" Vinson, Peter Noone, Johnny Paycheck, Eric Andersen, David Rea, Murray McLauchlan, Sylvia Tyson, Valdy, Jackie Washington and Harry Manx. For film, he was hired to do guitar arrangements for Hollywoodland, starring Ben Affleck, and has worked for Atom Egoyan. He coached Channing Tatum on guitar for The Vow, and Jessica Chastain on  bass for Mama. Lewis was also house drummer and multi-instrumentalist for London Home County Music Fest for over eight years, played drums on a tour of Japan with Little Jimmy Bowskill and played guitar with Jon Lord of Deep Purple.

Discography

As session musician

 Ron Nigrini: "Above the Noise" OA1201 – "Songs From Turtle Island", OA1202 – "Recordings 1975/1976" (no number)
 Rachel Kane: "Groundwire", RK0001 – "All in a Dream", RK0002
 Emigre: Self-titled, Attic Records LAT 1066, 1979.
 Mark Haines and Tom Leighton: "Optimists", Jig HL0297 – "Hand to Hand", BCD136 – "Foot to Floor", HL1292
 Tom Leighton: Leighton Tendencies (no number)
 Sophia Perlman and The Vipers: "Once Smitten", SPV07 – "The Vipers", (no number)
 Chuck Jackson's Big Bad Blues Band: "A Cup of Joe",  LINUS 270147
 Caitlin Hanford: "Bluer Skies", CAN9027
 Raffi: "Raffi in Concert with the Rise and Shine Band", MCAD10035
 The Canadian Aces: "Live at Alberts Hall", PACE 058
 Kenny "Blues Boss" Wayne: "88th and Jump St.", Electro-Fi 3371
 Doc Fingers and his Real Gone Rhythm: "In The Pink", DF006
 Friskey Brown: "Sweet and Slow"
 Handsome Dewey and the Swag: "Diamonds and Gasoline"
 Live at the Reservoir Lounge (Compilation)
 2B3: "The Toronto Sessions"
 Danny Brooks: "Soulsville – Souled Out 'n Sanctified", HIS House Records, 2004
 Michal Hasek and Sundog: "Naja", (recorded 1974)

References

External links 
 Mitch Lewis' YouTube channel
 

Living people
1954 births
Canadian session musicians
Canadian folk musicians
Canadian jazz musicians
Canadian rhythm and blues musicians
Canadian children's musicians
Canadian guitarists
Canadian drummers
Canadian male drummers
Canadian film score composers
Male film score composers
Musicians from Toronto
Canadian male guitarists
Canadian male jazz musicians